A by-election was held for the New South Wales Legislative Assembly electorate of Eastern Division of Camden on 15 March 1859 because Robert Owen's seat was declared vacant on his acceptance of an appointment as a judge of the District Court, filling the position created by the resignation of John Hargrave. The Illawarra Mercury reported that the nomination of John Tighe was intended to cause one week's delay before Hargrave could take his seat.

Dates

Result

Robert Owen's seat was declared vacant on his acceptance of an appointment as a judge of the District Court, filling the position created by the resignation of John Hargrave.

See also
Electoral results for the district of Eastern Division of Camden
List of New South Wales state by-elections

Notes

References

1859 elections in Australia
New South Wales state by-elections
1850s in New South Wales